CodePen is an online community for testing and showcasing user-created HTML, CSS and JavaScript code snippets. It functions as an online code editor and open-source learning environment, where developers can create code snippets, called "pens," and test them. It was founded in 2012 by full-stack developers Alex Vazquez and Tim Sabat and front-end designer Chris Coyier. Its employees work remotely, rarely all meeting together in person. CodePen is a large community for web designers and developers to showcase their coding skills, with an estimated 330,000 registered users and 14.16 million monthly visitors.

References

External links 

Computing websites
Web development
Software developer communities